John Raymond Hills (24 February 1934 – 28 November 2021) was an English professional footballer who played for Gravesend & Northfleet, Tottenham Hotspur and Bristol Rovers.

Playing career
Hills was educated at the Gravesend County Grammar School. He played his early football with Dashwood Athletic before signing for Gravesend & Northfleet.

Tottenham Hotspur signed Hills as an amateur in March 1950. After completing National Service with the RAF, Hills signed professional forms for the Spurs in August 1953. Originally an inside forward the club converted him to full back. He made his senior debut against Blackpool on 14 December 1957 and kept his place in the team during the season making 21 league and two FA Cup appearances while Tottenham Hotspurs finished third.He made seven appearances in the 1958–59 season and two in the 1959–60 season. Hills started in the club's all-time record win, a 13–2 in an FA Cup replay against Crewe Alexandra on 3 February 1960. The highlight of his White Hart Lane career was the first shared 4–4 draw with Arsenal on 22 February 1958. The clubs shared their first 4–4 draw in Division One with the Gunners leading 4–2 with 86 minutes played before Tommy Harmer converted a penalty and Bobby Smith scored the equaliser. In all, he featured in over 200 fixtures for the first team and the reserve team, earning The Football Combination medal in the 1956–57 season.

In July 1961 Hills transferred to Bristol Rovers where he participated in seven matches. A year later, he joined Margate before a knee injury ended his competitive career.

Post-football career
After retiring from football, Hills qualified as a PE teacher and taught in Belgium, Paris and Sri Lanka before retiring and settling in Brussels, where he died on 28 November 2021, at the age of 87.

References

External links

1934 births
2021 deaths
People from Northfleet
Footballers from Kent
People educated at Gravesend Grammar School
English footballers
Association football fullbacks
English Football League players
Ebbsfleet United F.C. players
Tottenham Hotspur F.C. players
Bristol Rovers F.C. players
Margate F.C. players